Sir Arnold Amet is a Papua New Guinean former politician and judge. He was a member of the National Parliament of Papua New Guinea from 2007 to 2012, representing the Madang Provincial seat. He was Minister for Justice and Attorney-General from 2010 to 2011. Prior to entering politics, he was Chief Justice of Papua New Guinea. In February 2021 he was nominated as the Allegiance Party (Papua New Guinea) candidate for the seat of Moresby North West District but was unsuccessful in securing the seat. He was awarded Knight Bachelor for service to the judiciary, law and justice in 1993.

Education 

Amet completed his secondary education at The Armidale School in northern New South Wales, Australia, and graduated from the University of Papua New Guinea with a Bachelor of Law degree in 1975. He was admitted as a lawyer in Papua New Guinea in 1976.

Career 

After graduation, Amet joined the Public Solicitor's Office of Papua New Guinea as a lawyer (1976 - 1979). After a period as legal officer and corporate secretary for national airline Air Niugini, he rejoined the public services as first Associate Public Solicitor (1981) and subsequently Public Solicitor (1982) of Papua New Guinea. He was admitted as a judge of the National and Supreme Courts of Papua New Guinea in 1983.

Amet was made Chief Justice of Papua New Guinea in 1993 at the age of 41, succeeding Papua New Guinea's first Chief Justice, Sir Buri Kidu. He completed his term in August 2003 and was succeeded by Sir Mari Kapi.

Amet was elected Governor of Madang Province in November 2007 as a member of the National Alliance. In December 2010 he was appointed Minister for Justice and Attorney General in Prime Minister Sir Michael Somare's Cabinet. He held this Ministry until the government was brought down by a parliamentary motion of no confidence in August 2011 during the 2011-2012 Papua New Guinean constitutional crisis whereupon he moved to the Opposition benches. He was defeated by Jim Kas at the 2012 election.

He has been appointed visiting Justice in the courts of Vanuatu, Fiji and Solomon Islands.

In February 2021, he was nominated as the Allegiance Party (Papua New Guinea) candidate for the seat of Moresby North West District, which required a byelection after the death of incumbent Member of Parliament, Sir Mekere Morauta.

Amet has held a range of leadership roles. He was Chairman of the Manam Humanitarian Committee, chair of the 2004 Commonwealth Observer Group for Solomon Islands' elections, and a member of the 2004 international Eminent Persons Group tasked with assessing the political and human rights situation in Fiji following its 2000 military coup.

Environmental Activism 

Amet has been active in campaigning on a range of environmental issues affecting his home province of Madang.

In 2020, he led efforts to stop a sand mining operation proposed by Singapore-based company Niugini Sands Ltd. on 38 kilometers of black sand beach in Sungilbar, Madang Province. Amet said that mining the sands would impact on thousands of people and threaten the environment, including the breeding grounds of endangered leatherback turtles. Amet wrote to the Department for Justice to request an extension of community consultation and for deeper engagement with authorising agency the Minerals Resource Authority, and said that court proceedings would be filed if required.

Amet had previously been vocal in opposing the proposed deep-sea sand-mining project, Solwara 1, which ultimately failed.

In April 2011, Amet organised a meeting in Madang so that landowners potentially affected by changes to the Madang Pacific Marine Industrial Zone could express their views and concerns to members of the government. A heated exchange of words took place between Amet and then Member for Madang Open Ken Fairweather after Fairweather and other Members of Parliament arrived several hours late to the consultation.

References

Chief justices of Papua New Guinea
Governors of Madang Province
People from Madang Province
Members of the National Parliament of Papua New Guinea
Government ministers of Papua New Guinea
Living people
National Alliance Party (Papua New Guinea) politicians
1952 births
Papua New Guinean knights
Papua New Guinean Knights Bachelor